Yikes! is the fifth studio album by London Elektricity. It was released in April 2011 through Hospital Records. The album features vocals by Elsa Esmeralda and Pat Fulgoni.

"Round the World In a Day" features Pendulum's Kevin Sawka on drums.

Track listing

References

External links 
 Yikes! at Discogs

2011 albums
London Elektricity albums
Hospital Records albums